Sherwood Forest Plantation Foundation is located on the north bank of the James River in Charles City County, Virginia. The main plantation house, built in 1730, was the home of President John Tyler (1790–1862) for the last twenty years of his life. It is located on State Route 5, a scenic byway which runs between the independent cities of Richmond and Williamsburg. It was designated a National Historic Landmark in 1961.

History 

Sherwood Forest is the only private residence in the United States to have been owned by two unrelated U.S. presidents. William Henry Harrison inherited the plantation, then named Walnut Grove, in 1790 and held it for three years. He sold the  property in 1793 having never lived in the house.

John Tyler renamed the plantation Sherwood Forest in 1842. He said it signified that he had been "outlawed" by the Whig party. He was attracted to the plantation because it was near his birthplace at Greenway Plantation. He retired there when he left the White House in 1845 and spent the rest of his life there with his second wife Julia Gardiner Tyler and some of his children. He had eight with his first wife and seven with his second wife.

Pearl, the youngest, was born in 1860, when Tyler was 70 years old; she died in 1947.

As regional hostilities in the United States escalated to become the American Civil War in 1861, Tyler backed Virginia's secession, although he died in January 1862. Later that spring, the house was occupied by Union soldiers during McClellan's Peninsula Campaign of 1862 and again during Grant's Overland Campaign in 1864. During the latter, the Battle of Wilson's Wharf was fought nearby. When an Ohio regiment vacated the house in 1864, they attempted to raze it with fire as a punishment for Tyler's support of the Confederacy. The fire was quickly extinguished by a loyal slave and did little damage to the house.

Owners of the house who started restoring it in the mid-1970s started removing some home-made storm windows and then discovered from old records that Tyler had built them himself, so they kept them. One of the house's claims to fame is its length; 301 feet (91 m). It is noted for its long, skinny ballroom, a "hyphen" Tyler had added to the house to accommodate the style of dancing popular then - what is today called "line dancing" but was then the "Virginia reel."

The house has been in the Tyler family since it was purchased in 1842. The house currently is owned by Harrison Ruffin Tyler, President Tyler's grandson, and the son of Lyon Gardiner Tyler; he and his wife, Frances Payne Bouknight Tyler, restored the home and grounds based on information gathered from over 47,000 letters describing the decor, furnishings, and landscape. It is open to the public for tours by appointment. The grounds are open daily for self-guided tours from 9am-5pm excepting Thanksgiving and Christmas days.

Cemetery
A pet cemetery is located on the property, where Tyler family pets were and still are buried, most notably, John Tyler's horse, The General.

See also
 List of residences of presidents of the United States
List of National Historic Landmarks in Virginia
National Register of Historic Places listings in Charles City County, Virginia

References

External links

Sherwood Forest webpage
"Life Portrait of John Tyler", from C-SPAN's American Presidents: Life Portraits, broadcast from Sherwood Forest Plantation, May 17, 1999
Sherwood Forest, State Route 5 vicinity, Charles City, Charles City, VA: 30 photos, 2 color transparencies, 3 data pages, and 3 photo caption pages at Historic American Buildings Survey
Sherwood Forest, Necessary, State Route 5 vicinity, Charles City, Charles City, VA: 2 photos and 1 photo caption page at Historic American Buildings Survey
Sherwood Forest, Dairy, State Route 5 vicinity, Charles City, Charles City, VA: 2 photos and 1 photo caption page at Historic American Buildings Survey
Sherwood Forest, Smokehouse, State Route 5 vicinity, Charles City, Charles City, VA: 2 photos and 1 photo caption page at Historic American Buildings Survey
Sherwood Forest, Wine House, State Route 5 vicinity, Charles City, Charles City, VA: 1 photo and 1 photo caption page at Historic American Buildings Survey

Historic American Buildings Survey in Virginia
Houses on the National Register of Historic Places in Virginia
Museums in Charles City County, Virginia
James River plantations
Presidential homes in the United States
National Historic Landmarks in Virginia
John Tyler
Historic house museums in Virginia
Harrison family of Virginia
Presidential museums in Virginia
Georgian architecture in Virginia
Houses in Charles City County, Virginia
National Register of Historic Places in Charles City County, Virginia
Tyler family residences
Virginia Historic Landmarks